Viola is an unfinished romantic opera by Bedřich Smetana. The libretto was written by Eliška Krásnohorská, and is based on Shakespeare's play Twelfth Night. The composer did some work on it in 1874 and then came back to it in 1883, when he only managed to orchestrate a few scenes; the opera was left incomplete upon Smetana's death in 1884.

Performance history
A concert performance (of the unfinished work) was given on 15 March 1900 and it was staged at the Prague National Theatre on 11 May 1924.

Roles

Recordings
 1982, Zdeněk Košler (conductor), Prague National Theatre Orchestra and Chorus; Jiří Pokorný (Piano), Marie Veselá, Drahomíra Drobková, Dalibor Jedlička, Jaroslav Horáček, Miroslav Švejda, Karel Hanuš

References

Further reading
 

Operas by Bedřich Smetana
Czech-language operas
operas
Unfinished operas
Operas based on works by William Shakespeare
Works based on Twelfth Night